Abyssivirga is a bacterial genus from the family of Lachnospiraceae with one known species (Abyssivirga alkaniphila).

References

Lachnospiraceae
Monotypic bacteria genera
Bacteria genera